Greek Canadians are Canadian citizens who have full or partial Greek heritage or people who emigrated from Greece and reside in Canada. According to the 2021 Census, there were 262,140 Canadians who claimed Greek ancestry.

Demographics
Provinces and territories with the highest population of Greek Canadians, according to 2016 Census:

Census Metropolitan Agglomerations (CMAs) with the highest population of Greek Canadians, according to 2016 Census:

Cities with the highest population of Greek Canadians, according to 2016 Census:

Ridings (Federal electoral districts) with the highest percentage of Greek Canadians, according to 2016 Census:

List of notable Canadians of Greek ancestry

Academics
Andreas Mandelis – expert on photonics, member of the Canadian Academy of Engineering; awarded the 2014 Killam Prize

Authors
Pan Bouyoucas – finalist for the Governor General's Literary Award, 2001
Tess Fragoulis – writer and educator
Thomas King – writer and broadcaster presenter
Dimitrios Roussopoulos – politician and activist
Hélène Papachristidis Holden - writer, recipient of Order of Canada

Professors
Athanasios Asimakopulos – Professor of Political Economy in the Department of Economics, McGill University
Nick Bontis – DeGroote School of Business, McMaster University 3M National Teaching Fellow
André Gerolymatos – Hellenic Studies
Dimitri Kitsikis – Professor Emeritus of History, Fellow of the Royal Society of Canada
Fotini Markopoulou-Kalamara – Physics
John Mylopoulos – Computer Science
Nikolaos Oikonomides – Byzantine history
David N. Stamos – Philosophy
Anastasios Venetsanopoulos – Vice President of Research and Innovation at Ryerson University

Business and philanthropy

Jack Agrios – former director and executive member of the Edmonton Eskimos 
Andreas Apostolopoulos – real estate
Chris Giannou – war surgeon
Sam Kolias – founder, Chairman and CEO of Boardwalk REIT
Mike Lazaridis – founder and co-CEO of Research In Motion (RIM), creator of BlackBerry
Sam Panopoulos - Chef and businessman best known for his invention of the Hawaiian Pizza

Creatives

Artists
Pythia (drag queen) – drag queen
Eleonora Dimakos – model, actress, journalist and makeup artist 
Billy Mavreas – cartoonist
Paul Soulikias – artist painter
Chrysanne Stathacos - multidisciplinary artist 
George Trakas – environmental sculptor

Sport

Athletics
Nicolas Macrozonaris – 100m sprinter

Baseball
Alex Anthopoulos – Vice President of Baseball Operations for the Los Angeles Dodgers, former Blue Jays General Manager
George Kottaras – Major League player
Vickie Panos – player, All-American Girls Professional Baseball League in

Basketball
Naz Mitrou-Long – NBA player, Utah Jazz and Indiana Pacers
Elijah Mitrou-Long - player with PAOK of the Greek Basket League

Boxing
Hercules Kyvelos – boxer

Chess
Peter Biyiasas – chess grandmaster

Diving
Alexandre Despatie – diver, Olympic silver medalist (Greek grandmother)

Field hockey
Ernie Cholakis – player

Figure skating
Madeline Schizas

Football
Dave Sapunjis – CFL all-star receiver, Calgary Stampeders

Ice hockey
Andreas Athanasiou – NHL player for the Chicago Blackhawks
Chris Kontos – former National Hockey League (NHL) player
Chris Kotsopoulos — former NHL player, New York Rangers, Hartford Whalers, Toronto Maple Leafs, and Detroit Red Wings
Tom Kostopoulos – former NHL player, Pittsburgh Penguins, Carolina Hurricanes, Montreal Canadiens and Calgary Flames
Nick Kypreos – former NHL player, Toronto Maple Leafs and New York Rangers
Jordan Kyrou – NHL player for the St. Louis Blues; gold medalist at the 2018 World Junior Championships 
Dave Nonis – former Canadian ice hockey defenceman; former general manager and executive of the National Hockey League's Vancouver Canucks and Toronto Maple Leafs.
José Théodore – former NHL player; Hart Memorial Trophy winner in 2002 with the Montreal Canadiens

Mixed Martial Arts
Elias Theodorou – former UFC middleweight

Soccer
David Fronimadis – player
Stathis Kappos – player
John Limniatis – player
James Pantemis – goalkeeper, CF Montréal
Nick Papadakis – player
Peter Sarantopoulos – player
Kenny Stamatopolous – player, former Toronto FC and Kalamata
Sarah Stratigakis - midfield, Michigan Wolverines, Canadian Women's National Team
Theo Zagar – player

Strength athletics
Dominic Filiou – strongman

Water skiing
George Athans – water-skier

Wrestling
Bret Hart – former pro wrestler, multiple World Champion in the WWF and WCW; of Greek ancestry; mother is half Greek
Owen Hart – former pro wrestler, WWE Intercontinental Champion, European Champion and Tag-Team Champion, brother of Bret
Teddy Hart – pro wrestler, nephew of Owen and Bret
Jim Korderas – former WWE referee, television commentator
Natalya Neidhart – pro wrestler, former WWE Women's Champion, niece of Bret and Owen Hart
Trish Stratus (aka Patricia Anne Stratigias) – former professional wrestler, seven time WWE Women's Champion, former WWE Hardcore Champion
John Tolos – former professional wrestler and professional wrestling manager

Film, TV and stage

Actors and performers
Marie Avgeropoulos – actress, Tracers, Supernatural, Fringe, The 100
Alex Carter – actor
John Colicos – actor 
Chris Diamantopoulos – actor
John Ioannou – actor
John Kapelos – actor
Athena Karkanis – actress, The Border, Lost Girl, Low Winter Sun, The Lottery
Argiris Karras – actor
Alex Karzis – actor, singer and musician
Elias Koteas – actor, Crash
Natasha Negovanlis – actress and web host
Nikki Ponte – singer
Cristine Prosperi – actress
Daniel Samonas – actor
Sofia Shinas – singer, actress, The Crow
Tracy Spiridakos – actress, Being Human, Revolution
Elias Toufexis – actor
Angelo Tsarouchas – comedian/actor It's all Greek to Me Comedy Show
Nia Vardalos – actress, screenwriter, My Big Fat Greek Wedding 
Marie Wilson – actress, Days of Our Lives, General Hospital

Directors and producers
Tony Asimakopoulos – documentary film director
Stephano Barberis - music video director
Constant Mentzas - filmmaker
Watts – music producer, born Austin Garrick

Entertainers
Rex Harrington - ballet dancer
Ariana Chris – mezzo-soprano
Christine Cushing – celebrity chef
Dini Dimakos – comedian/actor, Video on Trial, Love Court
DVBBS – electronic duo, most famous for their joint international hit with Borgeous, Tsunami
Hannah Georgas – singer/songwriter
Alex Karzis – actor, voiceover artist, musician and singer
KO – musician
Sid Krofft – puppeteer
George Sapounidis – musician, troubadour, statistician, Sinophile; subject of documentary Chairman George
Teresa Stratas (born 1938) – soprano OC; retired Canadian operatic soprano; known for her award-winning recording of Alban Berg's Lulu; born in Toronto, Ontario
Angelo Tsarouchas – comedian/actor, It's all Greek to Me Comedy Show
Phil X (born Phil Xenidis) – prolific session guitarist

Journalists and broadcasters
Ernie Afaganis – retired CBC-TV Sports and Olympics anchor.
Mannie Buzunis - Vancouver radio talk show host and news anchor (maternal uncle is Ernie Afaganis)
Thalia Assuras – anchor and reporter
Athena King – newscaster on Naked News
Steve Kouleas – sports anchor and reporter
George Lagogianes – television personality, currently reporter and anchor for CP24; host of Auto Shop
Nik Nanos – political commentator and founder of Nanos Research
 Ioanna Roumeliotis – CBC Newsworld reporter
Lou Schizas – equities analyst
George Stroumboulopoulos – host, CBC Newsworld's The Hour, former MuchMusic VJ
Christina-Laia Vlahos – OMNI 1 presenter
Antonia Zerbisias – Toronto Star columnist
Vassy Kapelos — host, CBC News Network's Power & Politics, former Global News Ottawa bureau chief
Niki Anastasakis — Producer and Anchor, CHCH's Inside the Story, former Global News Peterborough Reporter

Historical figures

Immigrants
Ioánnis Fokás Juan de Fuca – first Greek-Canadian (1592)

Politicians
Annie Koutrakis - Liberal MP for Vimy, Quebec
Sophia Aggelonitis – former Liberal MPP for Hamilton Mountain
Niki Ashton – NDP Member of Parliament for the electoral district of Churchill, Manitoba
Eleni Bakopanos – former Liberal MP for Saint-Denis
Staff Barootes – former Conservative Senator
Marie Bountrogianni – former Liberal MPP for Hamilton Mountain
John Cannis – former Liberal MP for Scarborough Centre, 1993 to 2011
Tony Clement – Member of Parliament for Muskoka, and President of the Treasury Board
Mary Fragedakis – Toronto City Councillor for Ward 29, Toronto-Danforth
Peter Fragiskatos – Liberal MP for London North Centre
Philippe Gigantès – former Liberal Senator
Faith Goldy – right-wing political commentator, former Toronto Mayoral candidate
Leo Housakos – Conservative Senator
Maurine Karagianis – New Democratic Party of British Columbia MLA, former Esquimalt – municipal councillor, British Columbia
Jim Karygiannis – Toronto City Councillor
Chris Kibermanis – Liberal candidate
Labi Kousoulis – Nova Scotia Liberal MLA for Halifax Citadel-Sable Island Minister of Finance and Treasury Board, Minister of Inclusive Economic Growth (formerly Business), and Minister of Trade.  
Emmanuella Lambropoulos – Liberal MP for Saint Laurent
Costas Menegakis – Former Conservative Party of Canada MP for Richmond Hill
Pana Merchant – Liberal Senator from Saskatchewan
Christina Mitas - PC MPP for Scarborough Centre, 2018 to present
Constantine George Mitges – former PC MP, first Greek elected federally
Nick Mantas - Toronto City Councillor, Ward 22, Scarborough - Agincourt
George Samis – former Ontario New Democratic Party MPP, first Greek elected to a Canadian legislature
Christos Sirros – former Quebec Liberal MNA and provincial cabinet minister
Gerry Sklavounos – Liberal Member of the Québec National Assembly
Dimitri Soudas – Former Communications Director to the Prime Minister of Canada
Diane Stratas – former Progressive Conservative MP for Scarborough Centre, 1979 to 1980
Effie Triantafilopoulos - PC MPP for Oakville-North Burlington, 2018 to present

Judiciary
Justice Andromache Karakatsanis – Supreme Court of Canada, 2011 to present
Justice David Stratas – Federal Court of Appeal, 2009 to present

Religious figures
Nicholas Salamis – priest
Christophoros (Rakintzakis) – bishop

Order of Canada recipients
Teresa Stratas (born 1938) – soprano OC; retired Canadian operatic soprano; known for her award-winning recording of Alban Berg's Lulu; born in Toronto, Ontario

Order of Merit of the Police Forces recipients 

 Peter Lambrinakos MOM – Canadian police and corporate security executive.

See also

Canadian-Greek relations
Greek Torontonians
Canadian people of Greek descent
Philhellenism
1918 Toronto anti-Greek riot

References

External links
hellenism.net – a comprehensive list of famous Greeks and Greek Americans

Further reading

External links

Greek-Canadians – A comprehensive list of famous Greeks and Greek Canadians
GreekGateway.com – Greek cultural entertainment site, event resource and business directory
Toronto-Danforth political riding with concentrated Hellenic population

Embassy and Consulates
Embassy of Greece in Ottawa, Ontario
Consulate General of Greece in Toronto, Ontario
Consulate General of Greece in Montreal, Quebec
Consulate General of Greece in Vancouver, British Columbia

Charitable organizations
AHEPA home page – American Hellenic Educational Progressive Association
Hellenic Heritage Foundation
Hellenic Home for the Aged
Hellenic Hope Center – supports people with disabilities
Hellenic Scholarships

Communities
Ottawa Hellenic Community
Toronto Greek Community
Hellenic Community of York Region
Greek Community of London
Hellenic Community of Greater Montreal
Winnipeg, Manitoba
Calgary
Victoria, British Columbia
Hellenic Community of Vancouver

Trade organizations
Hellenic Canadian Board of Trade
Hellenic Canadian Lawyers Association
Hellenic Canadian Congress of British Columbia

Affiliate trade organizations
Hellenic-American Chamber of Commerce
Hellenic-Argentine Chamber of Industry and Commerce (C.I.C.H.A.)

Performance art groups
Kyklos
Theatre Nefeli

Canadian people of Greek descent
Canada
European Canadian
 
Greek